Hermaea variopicta is a species of sacoglossan sea slug, a shell-less marine opisthobranch gastropod mollusk in the family Hermaeidae.

Distribution
This species is known to occur in the Mediterranean, Morocco, Atlantic coast of France and southwestern England.

References

External links
 

Hermaeidae
Gastropods described in 1869